Gas-operation is a system of operation used to provide energy to operate locked breech, autoloading firearms. In gas-operation, a portion of high-pressure gas from the cartridge being fired is used to power a mechanism to dispose of the spent case and insert a new cartridge into the chamber. Energy from the gas is harnessed through either a port in the barrel or a trap at the muzzle. This high-pressure gas impinges on a surface such as a piston head to provide motion for unlocking of the action, extraction of the spent case, ejection, cocking of the hammer or striker, chambering of a fresh cartridge, and locking of the action.

History 
The first mention of using a gas piston in a single-shot breech-loading rifle comes from 1856, by the German Edward Lindner who patented his invention in the United States and Britain. In 1866, Englishman William Curtis filed the first patent on a gas-operated repeating rifle, but subsequently failed to develop that idea further. Between 1883 and 1885, Hiram Maxim filed a number of patents on blowback-, recoil-, and gas-operation. In 1885, one year after Maxim's first gas-operated patent, a British inventor called Richard Paulson, who a year before had patented a straight blowback-operated rifle and pistol, again, one year after Maxim’s first blowback patent, patented a gas piston-operated rifle and pistol which he claimed could be used with sliding, rotating or falling bolts. He would also patent a gas-operated revolver in 1886. It is not known whether Paulson ever constructed prototypes of his patents but according to
A. W. F. Taylerson, a firearms historian, his patented revolver was probably workable. In 1886 a gas-operated conversion of the Italian Vetterli bolt-action rifle was produced by the Italian Amerigo Cei-Rigotti which he also claimed could be adapted to other bolt-action magazine rifles. While his conversion received positive approval at first to the point of being officially adopted for the Italian Royal Navy after further refinements in 1895, orders for the weapon never came through for unknown reasons and another variant developed in 1900 performed poorly in tests conducted by a variety of nations ultimately leading to its abandonment. In 1887, an American inventor called Henry Pitcher patented a gas-operated conversion system that he claimed could be applied to any manually-operated magazine rifle. In 1890 he would patent and submit an original gas-operated rifle for testing by the US government but it performed poorly and was ultimately never adopted despite being offered commercially for the civilian market. In the 1880s a gas piston-operated rifle and pistol were developed by the Clair Brothers of France who received a French patent and submitted prototypes for testing by the French army in 1888 although the true date of their invention is uncertain. They would also produce a semi-automatic shotgun in the early 1890s. In 1889, the Austro-Hungarian Adolf Odkolek von Újezd filed a patent for the first successful gas-operated machine gun.

Piston systems 
Most current gas systems employ some type of piston.  The face of the piston is acted upon by combustion gas from a port in the barrel or a trap at the muzzle. Early guns, such as Browning's "flapper" prototype, the Bang rifle, and Garand rifle, used relatively low-pressure gas from at or near the muzzle. This, combined with larger operating parts, reduced the strain on the mechanism. To simplify and lighten the firearm, gas from nearer the chamber needed to be used. This high-pressure gas has sufficient force to destroy a firearm unless it is regulated somehow. Most gas-operated firearms rely on tuning the gas port size, mass of operating parts, and spring pressures to function. Several other methods are employed to regulate the energy. The M1 carbine incorporates a very short piston, or "tappet." This movement is closely restricted by a shoulder recess. This mechanism inherently limits the amount of gas taken from the barrel. The M14 rifle and M60 GPMG use the White expansion and cutoff system to stop (cut off) gas from entering the cylinder once the piston has traveled a short distance. Most systems, however, vent excess gas into the atmosphere through slots, holes, or ports.

Gas trap 
A gas trap system involves "trapping" combustion gas as it leaves the muzzle. This gas impinges on a surface that converts the energy to motion that, in turn cycles the action of the firearm. As the resulting motion is forward toward the muzzle of the gun, some sort of mechanical system is needed to translate this into the rearward motion needed to operate the bolt. This adds to the complexity of the mechanism and its weight, and the placement of the trap generally results in a longer weapon and allows dirt to easily enter the mechanism. Despite these disadvantages, they used relatively low pressure gas and did not require a hole in the barrel, which made them attractive in early designs. The system is no longer used in modern weapons. 

Hiram Maxim patented a muzzle-cup system in 1884 described in  though it is unknown if this firearm was ever prototyped. The Danish Bang rifle used a muzzle cup blown forward by muzzle gas to operate the action through transfer bars and leverage. Other gas-trap rifles were early production M1 Garands and German Gewehr 41 (both Walther and Mauser models). 

The American and German governments both had requirements that their guns operated without a hole being drilled in the barrel. Both governments would first adopt weapons and later abandon the concept. Most earlier US M1 Garand rifles were retrofitted with long-stroke gas pistons, making the surviving gas trap rifles valuable in the collector's market.

In the 1980s Soviet designer Alexander Adov from TsKIB SOO modified the concept with a tube diverting gas from the muzzle to a standard long stroke system (see below) in order to diminish influence of the gas engine on barrel and increase accuracy, but his sniper rifle wasn't adopted due to the dissolution of the Soviet Union.

Long-stroke 

With a long-stroke system, the piston is mechanically fixed to the bolt group and moves through the entire operating cycle.  This system is used in weapons such as the Bren light machine gun, AK-47, Tavor, FN Minimi, FN MAG, FN FNC, and M1 Garand. The primary advantage of the long-stroke system is that the mass of the piston rod adds to the momentum of the bolt carrier enabling more positive extraction, ejection, chambering, and locking. The primary disadvantage to this system is the disruption of the point of aim due to several factors such as: the center of mass changing during the action cycle, abrupt stops at the beginning and end of bolt carrier travel, and the use of the barrel as a fulcrum to drive the bolt back. Also, due to the greater mass of moving parts, more gas is required to operate the system that, in turn, requires larger operating parts.

Short-stroke 
 

With a short-stroke or tappet system, the piston moves separately from the bolt group. It may directly push the bolt group parts, as in the M1 carbine, or operate through a connecting rod or assembly, as in the Armalite AR-18 or the SKS. In either case, the energy is imparted in a short, abrupt push and the motion of the gas piston is then arrested allowing the bolt carrier assembly to continue through the operating cycle through kinetic energy. This has the advantage of reducing the total mass of recoiling parts compared with a long-stroke piston. This, in turn, enables better control of the weapon due to less mass needing to be stopped at either end of the bolt carrier travel. This design is available both on the civilian and military markets as retrofit to the AR-15 family of weapons for addressing the shortcomings of the Stoner gas system.

Short-stroke fixed 
It is a cross between a short-stroke gas piston and a M1 Garand type long-stroke gas piston system. It is similar to a regular short-stroke piston in operation because it too uses an open gas piston that has an impingement cavity at its head, that rests on a gas block on the barrel. However just like the long-stroke gas piston system used on the M1 Garand the piston assembly is integrated with the operating rod and moves with the bolt group.

The caveat of this system is that it has heavier moving mass than modern long-stroke gas piston systems used on rifles like the AK-47, Tavor, FN FNC, etc. Hence firearms using this system do have higher felt recoil than their equivalent modern long-stroke gas piston counterparts.

Gas-delayed blowback 

The bolt is not locked but is pushed rearward by the expanding propellant gases as in other blowback-based designs. However, propellant gases are vented from the barrel into a cylinder with a piston that delays the opening of the bolt. It is used by Volkssturmgewehr 1-5 rifle, the Heckler & Koch P7, Steyr GB and Walther CCP pistols.

Floating chamber 

To avoid consuming a lot of relatively expensive rounds, many armies, including the United States Army, trained machine gun crews with less-expensive sub-caliber ammunition in the late 19th century and the first half of the 20th century. To do this, they needed a cheap .22 LR cartridge to operate firearms designed to use the .30-06 cartridge. David Marshall Williams invented a method that involved a separate floating chamber that acted as a gas piston with combustion gas impinging directly on the front of the floating chamber.  The .22 caliber Colt Service Ace conversion kit for the .45 caliber M1911 pistol also used Williams' system, which allows a much heavier slide than other conversions operating on the unaugmented blowback mechanism and makes training with the converted pistol realistic. A floating chamber provides additional force to operate the heavier slide, providing a felt recoil level similar to that of a full power cartridge.

Direct impingement 

The direct impingement (DI) method of operation vents gas from partway down the barrel through a tube to the working parts of a rifle where they directly impinge on the bolt carrier. This results in a simpler, lighter mechanism. Firearms that use this system include the French MAS-40 from 1940, the Swedish Ag m/42 from 1942. The Stoner gas system of the American M16 series and M4 utilizes a gas tube to directly impinge the bolt carrier, while the USMC's M27 is based on the short piston-driven HK416. One principal advantage is that the moving parts are placed in-line with the bore axis meaning that sight picture is not disturbed as much. This offers a particular advantage for fully automatic mechanisms. It has the disadvantage of the high-temperature propellant gas (and the accompanying fouling) being blown directly into the action parts.  Direct impingement operation increases the amount of heat that is deposited in the receiver while firing, which can burn off and cover up lubricants. The bolt, extractor, ejector, pins, and springs are also heated by the same high-temperature gas. These combined factors reduce service life of these parts, reliability, and mean time between failures.

Other uses of gas in firearms 

Several other uses have been found for exhaust gases other than to aid cycling:

 Muzzle booster The French Chauchat, German MG 34 and MG 42 machine guns, the British Vickers machine gun, and some other recoil operated firearms use a gas trap style mechanism to provide additional energy to 'boost' the energy provided by recoil. This "boost" provides higher rates of fire and/or more reliable operation. It is alternately called a gas assist, and may also be found in some types of blank-firing adapters.
 Gas ejection Patented by August Schüler, the Reform pistol featured a vertical row of barrels that advanced upwards with each shot exposing the fired chamber.  As the lower barrel fired, a gas hole between the barrels pressurized the empty barrel enough to eject the case rearward.  An extended spur on the hammer prevented the spent case from hitting the firer in the face.  The final case required manual extraction.

See also 
 Delayed blowback
 Recoil operation
 Blowback operation
 Blow forward

References 

 
Firearm actions